The Occupied Enemy Territory Administration in Ethiopia was a British military occupation administration in Ethiopia during East African Campaign of World War II. It expanded from early 1941 to the final Italian defeat in November and ended in January 1942 with the signing of the Anglo-Ethiopian Agreement. In Ethiopia, Emperor Haile Selassie was allowed to return and to claim his throne, but the OETA authorities ruled the country for some time before full sovereignty was restored to Ethiopia in 1944. However, some regions remained under British control for more years.

References

East African campaign (World War II)
History of Ethiopia